1976 Chess Olympiad may refer to:

 22nd Chess Olympiad, the official FIDE Olympiad held in Haifa, Israel, from 26 October to 10 November 1976
 Against Chess Olympiad, an unofficial Olympiad held in Tripoli, Libyan Arab Republic, from 24 October to 15 November 1976